Neau may refer to:

People
 Elias Neau, French Huguenot
 Stéphanie Neau (born 1975), French sport shooter

Places
 , Romania
 Neau, Mayenne, France
 Néau, Belgian city currently known as Eupen

Other
 Northeast Agricultural University, China